Pseudodonghicola is a genus of bacteria from the family of Rhodobacteraceae with one known species (Pseudodonghicola xiamenensis). Pseudodonghicola xiamenensis has been isolated from surface seawater from the Taiwan Strait in China.

References

Rhodobacteraceae
Bacteria genera
Monotypic bacteria genera